Casere Lake is a lake in the Province of Bergamo, Lombardy, Italy. The lake is an artificial lake, and is located by the comune of Branzi.

Lakes of Lombardy